White monkey is a term for the phenomenon of white foreigners or immigrants in China being hired for modeling, advertising, English teaching, or promotional jobs on the basis of their race. The phenomenon is based on the perception that association with foreigners, specifically white foreigners, can signify prestige, legitimacy, and international status. The jobs themselves, called "white monkey jobs" or "face jobs", often require little actual work on the part of the model, who in some cases is not expected to be fluent in Chinese. The concept is considered a subset of a larger "rent a foreigner" industry in China and parts of Asia.

White monkey jobs are often related to marketing and advertising. The "white monkey" may be hired to act as an associate of an individual or pose as an authoritative figure to promote a brand or company, and businesses will occasionally hire these individuals to pose as a founder or executive.

While the concept is less viable in larger urban areas with more international exposure, the practice is common in smaller urban centers and rural areas, especially those trying to expand or attract real-estate attention by feigning an international presence.

The concept of white monkey was covered in the documentary Dream Empire. Another example of this can be found in the final episode of the first season of the comedy series Awkwafina is Nora from Queens.

References 

Stereotypes of white people
Immigration to China
Employment in China
Migrant workers